On the Level is a 1930 American pre-Code action film directed by Irving Cummings and written by Andrew Bennison, William K. Wells and Dudley Nichols. The film stars Victor McLaglen, William Harrigan, Lilyan Tashman, Fifi D'Orsay, Arthur Stone and Leila McIntyre. The film was released on May 18, 1930, by Fox Film Corporation.

Cast    
Victor McLaglen as Biff Williams
William Harrigan as Danny Madden
Lilyan Tashman as Lynn Crawford
Fifi D'Orsay as Miimi
Arthur Stone as Don Bradley
Leila McIntyre as Mom Whalen
Mary McAllister as Mary Whalen
Ben Hewlett as Buck
Harry Tenbrook as Dawson
R.O. Pennell as Professor

References

External links
 

1930 films
1930s English-language films
American action films
1930s action films
Fox Film films
Films directed by Irving Cummings
American black-and-white films
1930s American films